The Keck Geology Consortium, founded in 1987, is a collection of 17 collaborating colleges and academic departments generally focusing on promoting undergraduate research in the fields of geology and earth sciences.  Primarily, the consortium organizes and funds undergraduate field research on projects around the world.  Past project locations include field sites in Mongolia, Alaska, Norway, Italy, the Caribbean, and North America.  The consortium's host school is Pomona College, in Claremont, California.

Member schools
Following is a list of participating schools, bold text indicates a founding member.

Amherst College
Beloit College
Carleton College
Colgate University
The College of Wooster
Colorado College
Franklin & Marshall College
Macalester College
Mt. Holyoke College
Oberlin College
Pomona College
Smith College
Trinity University
Union College
Washington and Lee University
Wesleyan University
Whitman College

External links
 Keck Geology Consortium homepage

References

Geology organizations